Lisa Zaiser (born 23 August 1994) is an Austrian swimmer, who specialized in individual medley events. Zaiser held an Austrian record time of 1:00.77 by finishing seventh in the women's 100 m individual medley at the 2011 European Short Course Swimming Championships in Szczecin, Poland. Zaiser is a member of Volksbank-Spittal Swimming Club ) in Spittal an der Drau, Carinthia, and is coached and trained by Ferdinand Kendi.

Zaiser qualified for the women's 200 m individual medley, as the youngest member of the Austrian swimming team (aged 17), at the 2012 Summer Olympics in London, by clearing a FINA B-standard entry time of 2:14.09 from the Austrian Indoor National 
Championships in Graz. She challenged seven other swimmers on the second heat, including Ireland's Sycerika McMahon and Iceland's Eygló Ósk Gústafsdóttir, both of whom shared the same age with Zaiser. She raced to second place by a hundredth of a second (0.01) behind Ukrainian swimmer and two-time Olympian Hanna Dzerkal, outside her qualified entry time of 2:14.56. Zaiser failed to advance into the semifinals, as she placed nineteenth overall out of 34 swimmers in the preliminary heats.

References

External links
 
Profile – Austrian Swimming Federation 
NBC Olympics Profile

1994 births
Living people
Austrian female medley swimmers
Olympic swimmers of Austria
Swimmers at the 2012 Summer Olympics
Swimmers at the 2016 Summer Olympics
People from Spittal an der Drau
Sportspeople from Carinthia (state)